Fagus orientalis, commonly known as the Oriental beech, is a deciduous tree in the beech family Fagaceae. It is native to Eurasia, in Eastern Europe and Western Asia.

Description

The flowers are small catkins which appear shortly after the leaves in spring.

The cupule differs from that of European Beech in having flattened, slightly leaf-like appendages at the base (slender, soft spines in European Beech).

Taxonomy
Fagus orientalis is closely related to the Fagus sylvatica (European Beech), and intergrades with it in the Balkans and northwestern Turkey. These hybrids with European Beech are named Fagus × taurica.

Distribution and habitat
The tree's natural range extends from southeastern Bulgaria's Strandja mountain, through northwest Turkey, and east to the Caucasus Mountains in Georgia and Russia, to the Alborz Mountains in Iran.

Use
The wood of Fagus orientalis is heavy, hard, strong and highly resistant to shock. These features makes it suitable for steam bending. The wood is also a source to fuelwood and can be used for constructions particleboard, furniture, flooring veneer, mining poles, railway tiles and paper.

See also
 Caucasus mixed forests ecoregion — key species in the ecoregion
Abies nordmanniana (Nordmann Fir)

References

External links
Oriental beech on Floridata
Fagus orientalis, Plants for a Future
 Fagus orientalis - distribution map, genetic conservation units and related resources. European Forest Genetic Resources Programme (EUFORGEN)

orientalis
Trees of Asia
Trees of Europe
Flora of Armenia
Flora of Azerbaijan
Flora of Bulgaria
Flora of Georgia (country)
Flora of Iran
Flora of Russia
Environment of Abkhazia